Hiranyavarman, the founder of the Mahidharapura Dynasty, was a king from the Upper Mun Valley near Phimai (northern region of Phnom Dangrek), a vassal state of Khmer Empire.

Biography 
King Hiranyavarman was the father of King Dharanindravarman I (r. 1107–1113) and King Jayavarman VI (r. 1082-1107). He never claimed that his dynasty has any link to the King Suryavarman I’s dynasty nor to any other lines of Khmer kings. However, his great-grandson, Dharanindravarman II claimed the throne through the marriage with Sri Jayarajacudamani, granddaughter of King Suryavarman I.

He was named after Hiranyavarman, a son of Somasaman and a daughter of King Viravarman.[1]

References

Cambodian monarchs
Khmer Empire
Hindu monarchs
Cambodian Hindus